The men's sabre was one of seven fencing events on the Fencing at the 1928 Summer Olympics programme. It was the eighth appearance of the event. The competition was held from 10 August 1928 to 11 August 1928. 44 fencers from 17 nations competed. For the third straight Games, the limit of fencers per nation was reduced (from 12 to 8 in 1920, from 8 to 4 in 1924, and from 4 to 3 in 1928). The event was won by Ödön von Tersztyánszky of Hungary, the second in a nine-Games streak of Hungarian wins. Attila Petschauer, also of Hungary, took silver. Italy's Bino Bini earned bronze.

Background
This was the eighth appearance of the event, which is the only fencing event to have been held at every Summer Olympics. Four of the twelve finalists from 1924 returned: silver medalist Roger Ducret of France, fifth-place finisher Adrianus de Jong of the Netherlands, sixth-place finisher Ivan Osiier of Denmark (now in his fifth Olympics), and Bino Bini of Italy, who had withdrawn from the 1924 final after Oreste Puliti had been disqualified for threatening a judge who ruled that Bini and others had thrown matches to Puliti. The Hungarian team had experience complete turnover from 1924, but was still expected to dominate; two-time defending world champion Sándor Gombos over teammates Ödön von Tersztyánszky and Attila Petschauer.

Bulgaria, Egypt, Romania, and Yugoslavia each made their debut in the men's sabre. Italy and Denmark each made their sixth appearance in the event, tied for most of any nation.

Competition format

The event used a three-round format. In each round, the fencers were divided into pools to play a round-robin within the pool. Bouts were to five touches (up from three in 1920 and four in 1924). Standard sabre rules applied.
 Quarterfinals: There were 8 pools of between 3 and 7 fencers each. The top 3 fencers in each quarterfinal advanced to the semifinals.
 Semifinals: There were 3 pools of 8 fencers each. The top 4 fencers in each semifinal advanced to the final.
 Final: The final pool had 12 fencers.

Schedule

Results

Source: Official results; De Wael

Quarterfinals

Each pool was a round-robin. Bouts were to five touches. The top three fencers in each pool advanced to the semifinals.

Quarterfinal A

Quarterfinal B

Quarterfinal C

Quarterfinal D

Quarterfinal E

Quarterfinal F

Quarterfinal G

Quarterfinal H

Semifinals

Each pool was a round-robin. Bouts were to five touches. The top four fencers in each pool advanced to the final.

Semifinal A

Semifinal B

Semifinal C

Final

The final was a round-robin. Bouts were to five touches. A tie for first-place was broken with a single barrage bout, with von Tersztyánszky defeating Petschauer 5-2.

References

Sabre men
Men's events at the 1928 Summer Olympics